Stanislas Bizot (December 22, 1879 in Nice – June 2, 1950) was a French draughts champion who debuted in 1901. He won the Draughts World Championship in 1925. In the following year he lost to Marius Fabre.

References

French draughts players
Sportspeople from Nice
1879 births
1950 deaths